The 2009–10 Netball Superleague (known for sponsorship reasons as the Co-operative Netball Superleague) was the fifth season of the Netball Superleague. The league was won by Team Bath. Surrey Storm finished top of the table after the regular season but subsequently lost to both Team Bath and Hertfordshire Mavericks in the playoffs. For a fourth season out of five, Team Bath defeated Mavericks in the grand final.

Teams
During the close season, Brunel Hurricanes ended their partnership with Brunel University London, relocated to the University of Surrey and became Surrey Storm. Galleria Mavericks were also renamed Hertfordshire Mavericks.

Regular season
Surrey Storm finished as regular season winners.

Final table

Playoffs
The play-offs utilised the Page–McIntyre system to determine the two grand finalists. This saw the top two from the regular season, Surrey Storm and Team Bath, play each other, with the winner going straight through to the grand final. The loser gets a second chance to reach the grand final via the minor final. The third and fourth placed teams, Northern Thunder and Hertfordshire Mavericks also play each other, and the winner advances to the minor final. The winner of the minor final qualifies for the grand final.

Minor semi-final

Major semi-final
 
Minor final

Grand Final

References

 
2009-10
 
 
2009 in Welsh women's sport
2010 in Welsh women's sport
2009 in Scottish women's sport
2010 in Scottish women's sport